Central Prince is a rural municipality within Prince County in Prince Edward Island that was incorporated on September 28, 2018 through an amalgamation of two municipalities. The municipalities that amalgamated were the rural municipalities of Ellerslie-Bideford and Lady Slipper.

Demographics 

Government 
The Rural Municipality of Central Prince is governed by an interim council comprising an interim mayor (Rod Millar) and six interim councillors.  The first election for a mayor and six councillors is scheduled for November 5, 2018.

References 

Rural municipalities in Prince Edward Island
Populated places established in 2018
2018 establishments in Prince Edward Island